Lembach is a commune in the Bas-Rhin department and Grand Est region of north-eastern France.

Etymology
The toponym Lembach is of Germanic origin, cognate to modern German Lehm, denoting clay. The Germanic hydronym *-bak(i) entered the French language via High German, and took on two forms: the Germanic form -bach and Romantic -bais.

Geography
Lembach lies in the Sauer valley, surrounded by the woods and sandstone cliffs of the Palatinate Forest-North Vosges Biosphere Reserve. It is located on Departmental Road 3 which runs from Wissembourg, 12 km to the east of Lembach, to the north-western tip of Bas-Rhin and the onward route to Bitche in the department of Moselle. The German frontier lies some 5 km to the north.

In the village centre is a Protestant church dating from 1750 (but incorporating a tower from the late Medieval period) as well as a nineteenth-century Catholic church.

The commune, which covers an extensive land area, much of it uninhabitable owing to the topography, also includes the small village of Mattstall and the hamlet of Pfaffenbronn.

Tourism
The spectacular scenery and the fortifications of past centuries, coupled with the limited possibilities for agriculture in the immediate area, make tourism a key source of employment.

The presence in Lembach of a well regarded haute cuisine restaurant has in recent years made the village something of a "centre of pilgrimage" for gourmets, many of whom cross the border from such nearby population centres as Karlsruhe, Germersheim, and Mannheim.

Clearly marked footpaths, some of them leading to ruined fortifications or to picturesque rock faces, are promoted as another tourist attraction. The best known and most substantial of the medieval period fortifications is probably the Château du Fleckenstein. The commune also includes a section of the Maginot Line.

History
The extensive territory has often found itself a crossing-point between the French and German worlds in times both of peace and of war.

In September 1972 the commune of Lembach was merged with the neighbouring village of Mattstall to the south. Mattstall retains the semi-independent status of an associated commune.

Notable people
 Author and doctor Paul Bertololy lived in Lembach and died there in 1972. (At the time of his birth at Frankenthal in 1892, Lembach was a part of Germany, and German was the mother tongue in which Bertololy wrote.)
 Claude-Hélène Perrot (1928-2019), historian and Africanist 
 Astronaut Rusty Schweickart is the grandson of a couple who emigrated from Lembach to the United States. He has visited the village twice and given his name to one of its streets.

Landmarks
 Fleckenstein castle
 Frœnsbourg castle
 The extensive Maginot line fortifications, known as "Ouvrage Four-à-Chaux"
 Lembach mill
 Fleckensteins' manor (Le manoir des Fleckenstein)
 Lembach farm and tile works (La ferme et tuilerie de Lembach)

See also
 Communes of the Bas-Rhin department

References

Bas-Rhin communes articles needing translation from French Wikipedia
Communes of Bas-Rhin